The 1997 Roller Hockey World Cup was the thirty-third roller hockey world cup, organized by the Fédération Internationale de Roller Sports. It was contested by 12 national teams (7 from Europe, 3 from South America, 1 from Africa and 1 from North America). The tournament was played in the city of Wuppertal, in Germany.

Group stage

Group A

Group B

Final phase

9th to 12th play-off

Final round

Standings

See also
 FIRS Roller Hockey World Cup

External links
 1997 World Cup in rink-hockey.net historical database

Roller Hockey World Cup
International roller hockey competitions hosted by Germany
1997 in roller hockey
1997 in German sport